Albert Atkinson (second ¼ 1909  – 1 April 1953) was an English professional rugby league footballer who played in the 1920s and 1930s.

Background
Albert Atkinson was born in Fothergill, Cumberland, England, and he died aged 43 in Halifax, West Riding of Yorkshire, England.

Playing career

International honours
Albert Atkinson won a cap for England while at Halifax in 1930 against Other Nationalities.

Challenge Cup Final appearances
Albert Atkinson played  in Halifax's 22-8 victory over York in the 1930–31 Challenge Cup Final during the 1930–31 League season at Wembley Stadium, London on Saturday 2 May 1931, in front of a crowd of 40,368, he was the first Cumbrian to play at Wembley Stadium, London.

Club career
Albert Atkinson signed for Halifax aged-18.

Genealogical information
Albert Atkinson's marriage to Mabel (née Green) was registered during third ¼ 1932 in Halifax district. They had children; Barbara J. Atkinson (birth registered first ¼ 1934  in Halifax district ), and June B. Atkinson (birth registered third ¼ 1936 in Halifax district).

References

External links
Search for "Atkinson" at rugbyleagueproject.org

West Cumberland Times, 2 May 1931, page 7, Maryport District News
Search for "Albert Atkinson" at britishnewspaperarchive.co.uk

1909 births
1953 deaths
England national rugby league team players
English rugby league players
Halifax R.L.F.C. players
Rugby league players from Cockermouth
Rugby league locks
Whitehaven R.L.F.C. players